Eucherius may refer to:
Saint Eucherius of Lyon, 5th century bishop
Saint Eucherius of Orléans, 8th century bishop
Eucherius was the son of Stilicho and was executed after him in 408

See also
Eucharius, bishop of Trier

Human name disambiguation pages